Fiona Campbell (born 29 June 1981) is a Scottish cricketer who has represented her country in several international matches.

Campbell is a leg spin bowler who bats low down the order and has been known to keep wicket on occasion. She made her official one day international debut against the Netherlands women on 21 July 2003. She held the record for the best innings figures for the Scottish women's cricket team for five years, taking 4 for 25 against Japan on 25 July 2003 at Den Haag in the Netherlands.

Born at Aberdeen, Campbell worked as the branch manager for Enterprise vehicle hire in Aberdeen airport.

References

External links

1981 births
Living people
Cricketers from Aberdeen
People from Ellon, Aberdeenshire
Scotland women One Day International cricketers
Scottish women cricketers
Wicket-keepers